Telemachus, in Greek mythology, is the son of Odysseus and Penelope, who is a central character in Homer's Odyssey. When Telemachus reached manhood, he visited Pylos and Sparta in search of his wandering father. On his return to Ithaca, he found that Odysseus had reached home before him.

The first four books of the Odyssey focus on Telemachus's journeys in search of news about his father, who has yet to return home from the Trojan War, and are traditionally given the title the Telemachy.

Etymology

Telemachus's name in Greek means "far from battle", or perhaps "fighting from afar", as a bowman does.

Odyssey

In Homer's Odyssey, Telemachus, under the instructions of Athena (who accompanies him during the quest), spends the first four books trying to gain knowledge of his father, Odysseus, who left for Troy when Telemachus was still an infant. At the outset of Telemachus' journey, Odysseus had been absent from his home at Ithaca for twenty years due to the Trojan War and the intervention of Poseidon. During his absence, Odysseus' house has been occupied by hordes of suitors seeking the hand of Penelope. Telemachus first visits Nestor and is well received by the old man who regales him with stories of his father's glory. Telemachus then departs with Nestor's son Peisistratus, who accompanies him to the halls of Menelaus and his wife Helen. Whilst there, Telemachus is again treated as an honored guest as Menelaus and Helen tell complementary yet contradictory stories of his father's exploits at Troy. Telemachus also learns from Menelaus that his father was last seen stranded on Ogygia.

Telemachus focuses on his father's return to Ithaca in Book XV.  He visits Eumaeus, the swineherd, who happens to be hosting a disguised Odysseus.  After Odysseus reveals himself to Telemachus due to Athena's advice, the two men plan the downfall of the suitors. Telemachus then returns to the palace to keep an eye on the suitors and to await his father as the beggar.

When Penelope challenges the suitors to string Odysseus' bow and shoot an arrow through the handle-holes of twelve axe heads, Telemachus is the first to attempt the task. He would have completed the task, nearly stringing the bow on his fourth attempt; however, Odysseus subtly stops him before he can finish his attempt. Following the suitors' failure at this task, Odysseus reveals himself and he and Telemachus bring swift and bloody death to the suitors.

Telegony

The Telegony was a short two-book epic poem recounting the life and death of Odysseus after the events of the Odyssey. In this mythological postscript, Odysseus is accidentally killed by Telegonus, his unknown son by the goddess Circe. After Odysseus' death, Telemachus returns to Aeaea with Telegonus and Penelope, and there marries Circe.

From the Dictionary of Greek and Roman Biography and Mythology:
Telemachus: The son of Odysseus and Penelope (Hom. Od. i. 216). He was still an infant at the time when his father went to Troy, and in his absence of nearly twenty years he grew up to manhood. After the gods in council had determined that Odysseus should return home from the island of Ogygia, Athena, assuming the appearance of Mentes, king of the Taphians, went to Ithaca, and advised Telemachus to eject the troublesome suitors of his mother from his house, and to go to Pylos and Sparta, to gather information concerning his father. Telemachus followed the advice, but the suitors refused to quit his house; and Athena, in the form of Mentes, accompanied Telemachus to Pylos. There they were hospitably received by Nestor, who also sent his own son to conduct Telemachus to Sparta. Menelaus again kindly received him, and communicated to him the prophecy of Proteus concerning Odysseus (Hom. Od. i.–iv.).From Sparta Telemachus returned home; and on his arrival there, he found his father, with the swineherd Eumaeus. But as Athena had metamorphosed him into a beggar, Telemachus did not recognise his father until the latter disclosed to him who he was. Father and son now agreed to punish the suitors; and when they were slain or dispersed, Telemachus accompanied his father to the aged Laertes. (Hom. Od. xv.–xxiv.; comp. Odysseus.)In the post-Homeric traditions, we read that Palamedes, when endeavouring to persuade Odysseus to join the Greeks against Troy, and the latter feigned idiocy, placed the infant Telemachus before the plough with which Odysseus was ploughing (Hygin. Fab. 95; Serv. ad Aen. ii. 81; Tzetz. ad Lycoph. 384; Aelian, V. H. xiii. 12.).According to some accounts, Telemachus became the father of Perseptolis either by Polycaste, the daughter of Nestor, or by Nausicaa, the daughter of Alcinous (Eustath. ad Hom. p. 1796; Dict. Cret. vi. 6.). Others relate that he was induced by Athena to marry Circe, and became by her the father of Latinus (Hygin. Fab. 127; comp. Telegonus), or that he married Cassiphone, a daughter of Circe, but in a quarrel with his mother-in-law he slew her, for which in his turn he was killed by Cassiphone (Tzetz. ad Lycoph. 808.). He is also said to have had a daughter called Roma, who married Aeneas (Serv. ad Aen. i. 273.).One account states that Odysseus, in consequence of a prophecy that his son was dangerous to him, sent him away from Ithaca. Servius (ad Aen. x. 167) makes Telemachus the founder of the town of Clusium in Etruria.

Later classical authors
In Contest of Homer and Hesiod, it is alleged that the Roman Emperor Hadrian asked the Delphic Oracle about Homer's birthplace and parentage. The Oracle replied that Homer came from Ithaca and that Telemachus was his father by Epicasta, daughter of Nestor.

According to Aristotle and Dictys of Crete, Telemachus married Nausicaa, King Alcinous' daughter, and fathered a son named Perseptolis or Ptoliporthus.

Other appearances
Telemachus is the subject of François Fénelon's The Adventures of Telemachus, Son of Ulysses (1699), a scathing attack on the monarchy of France.

Telemachus was the subject of numerous operas throughout the eighteenth century, most based on Fénelon's version. Among the most famous of these operas were André Cardinal Destouches's Télémaque (1714), Alessandro Scarlatti's Telemaco (1718), Gluck's Telemaco, ossia L'isola di Circe (1765), Giuseppe Gazzaniga's Gli errori di Telemaco (1776), Jean-François Le Sueur's Télémaque dans l'île de Calypso ou Le triomphe de la sagesse (1796), Simon Mayr's Telemaco nell'isola di Calipso (1797), and Fernando Sor's Telemaco nell'isola di Calipso (1797).

Telemachus is one of the main characters in Ulysses, a 1705 play by Nicholas Rowe.

Telemachus is featured in the 1833 poem (published in 1842) "Ulysses" by Alfred, Lord Tennyson.

In the 1922 novel Ulysses by James Joyce, Stephen Dedalus is generally regarded as corresponding to Telemachus.

"Telemachus" is the title of Book Three of Thomas Wolfe's autobiographical novel Of Time and the River (1935).

Joseph Brodsky published the poem "Odysseus to Telemachus" in 1972.

Telemachus is a frequent character in the poetry of Louise Glück.

Telemachus was the name of Carole King's cat and is pictured on the cover of her album Tapestry.

Telemachus appears as the son of Ulysses in the 1981 French-Japanese animated television series Ulysses 31.

Telemachus is a major character in Madeline Miller's novel Circe. He eventually marries and has children with Circe.

Telemachus is the title of a poem by American poet Ocean Vuong.

"Telemachus Sneezed" is the name of a fictional novel in The Illuminatus! Trilogy, and is a parody of the title of Ayn Rand's novel, Atlas Shrugged.

Notes

References
 Brann, Eva, Homeric Moments: Clues to Delight in Reading the Odyssey and the Iliad, Paul Dry Books, 2002. .
 Homer, The Odyssey with an English Translation by A.T. Murray, PH.D. in two volumes. Cambridge, MA., Harvard University Press; London, William Heinemann, Ltd. 1919. Online version at the Perseus Digital Library.

External links

 Telemachus – Τηλέμαχος, Carlos Parada at the Greek Mythology Link

Aftermath of war
Characters in the Odyssey
Children of Odysseus
Princes in Greek mythology